Albert J. Wilke was a member of the Michigan Senate.

Biography
Wilke was born on December 31, 1895, in Port Washington, Wisconsin. He died on July 29, 1977, in Iron Mountain, Michigan.

Career
Wilke was a member of the Senate from 1949 to 1950. Previously, he was Register of Deeds of Dickinson County, Michigan, from 1935 to 1946 and a delegate to the 1944 Democratic National Convention that nominated Franklin D. Roosevelt for a historic fourth term as President of the United States. He was an unsuccessful candidate in the general election for the Michigan House of Representatives in 1954 and in the Democratic primary in 1958.

References

People from Dickinson County, Michigan
People from Port Washington, Wisconsin
Democratic Party Michigan state senators
1895 births
1977 deaths
20th-century American politicians